Gustave Jéquier (14 August 1868 – 24 March 1946) was born in and died in Neuchâtel, Switzerland. He was an Egyptologist and one of the first archaeologists to excavate ancient Persian cities in what is now Iran. He was a member of Jacques de Morgan's 1901 Susa expedition, which led to the discovery of the famous Code of Hammurabi, now on display in the Louvre.

Jéquier began his career under the guidance of the Egyptologists Gaston Maspero and Jacques de Morgan, and specialized in the Predynastic Period. He participated in major excavations sponsored by the Supreme Council of Antiquities.

Jéquier excavated sites at Saqqara, such as the pyramid of Ibi and the pyramid of Khendjer, at Dahshur, Lisht, and Mazghuna.

Jéquier's work on the Pyramid Texts was a significant step forward in the understanding of these religious works.

Publications 
 Avec J.E. Gautier, Mémoire sur les fouilles de Licht, 1902 
 Avec Georges Legrain et Urbain Bouriant, Monuments pour servir à l'étude du culte d'Atonou en Égypte I, 1903
 Décoration égyptienne, plafonds et frises végétales du Nouvel Empire thébain (1400-1000 av. J.-C.), 1911
 Les Temples memphites et thébains des origines à la XVIIIe dynastie, 1920
 Les Temples ramessides et saïtes de la XIXe à la XXXe dynastie, 1922
 Le mastabat Faraoun : douze ans de fouilles à Saqqarah, 1928 
 La Pyramide d'Oudjebten, 1928 
 Deux pyramides du moyen empire, 1932 
 Les pyramides des reines Neit et Apouit, Fouilles à Saqqarah, 1933
 La pyramide d'Aba, 1935 
 Rapport préliminaire sur les travaux exécutés en 1935-1936 dans la partie méridionale de la nécropole memphite, ASAE, 1936
 Le monument funéraire de Pépi II, volume I. : Le tombeau royal, 1936 ; volume II. : Le temple, 1938 ; volume III. : Les  du temple, 1940 - IFAO 
 Douze ans de fouilles dans la nécropole memphite, 1924-1936, Université de Neuchâtel, 1940
 Avec Léon et Michel Jéquier, Armorial neuchâtelois. Avec la collaboration de Gustave Jéquier, Neuchâtel, La Baconnière, 1941–1944
 Considérations sur les religions égyptiennes, Neuchâtel, La Baconnière, 1946

References

External links 
 Biography of Gustave Jéquier (French language)
 
 

1868 births
1946 deaths
Swiss Egyptologists
People from Neuchâtel